Transmembrane Protein 144 (TMEM144) is a protein in humans encoded by the TMEM144 gene.

Gene 
Transmembrane Protein 144 is located on the plus strand of chromosome 4 (4q32.1), spanning a total of 40,857 base pairs. The TMEM144 gene  transcribes a mRNA sequence 3,210 nucleotides in length and composed of 13 exons.

Protein 
There exist two isoforms of human Transmembrane Protein 144. Isoform one consist of 345 amino acids with a total mass of 37.6 kDa. This isoform has a theoretical isoelectric point of 6.63. The second isoform is 169 amino acids long with a mass of 18.3 kDa.

Expression 
TMEM144 is over-expressed in adult brain tissue with low regional specificity. TMEM144 appears enriched in oligodendrocytes and immune cells, such as dendritic cells and monocytes.

Cellular Localization 
Precise cell localization has multiple predicted locations. Localization tools state TMEM144 is likely found in the plasma membrane, endoplasmic reticulum, Lysosome/Vacuole, or Golgi apparatus. However, an immunofluorescent staining of various human cell lines display localization to the mitochondria.

Post Translational Modifications  
There exists five predicted post translational modifications for TMEM144, including four sites of phosphorylation and a sumoylation site.

Interacting Proteins 
Several proteins have been observed to be physically associated with TMEM144, including Transmembrane Protein 237, Homocysteine-Responsive Endoplasmic Reticulum-Resident Ubiquitin-Like Domain Member 2 Protein, Translocase of Inner Mitochondrial Membrane Domain-Containing Protein 1, Free Fatty Acid Receptor 2, Aquaporin 6, Serine Rich Single-Pass Membrane Protein 1, and Adrenoceptor Beta 2.

Homology 
Transmembrane Protein 144 arose approximately 694 million years ago in desert locust. It can be found in both vertebrates and invertebrates. It takes TMEM144 approximately 6.8 million years to make a 1% change to its amino acid sequence, indicating a moderately low rate of evolution.

Ortholog Table

Clinical Significance 
Transmembrane Protein 144 is predicted to be a direct or indirect negative regulator of kisspeptin. High expression of TMEM144 is prognostically favorable for patient with endometrial cancer. Whereas in patients with pancreatic cancer, high expression of TMEM144 is associated with poor prognostic outcomes.

References 

Genes on human chromosome 4
Proteins